Kambadur is a village in Anantapur district of the Indian state of Andhra Pradesh. It is the headquarters of Kambadur mandal in Kalyandurg revenue division.

Demographics 
According to Indian census, 2001, the demographic details of Kambadur mandal is as follows:
 Total Population: 	46,740	in 9,522 Households.
 Male Population: 	23,950		and Female Population: 	22,790
 Children Under 6-years of age: 	6,803	(Boys -	3,514 and Girls -	3,289)
 Total Literates: 	21,390

References 

Villages in Anantapur district
Mandal headquarters in Anantapur district